This is a list of notable Bosnian Americans, including both original immigrants who obtained American citizenship and their American descendants.

Art
 Endi E. Poskovic, artist and printmaker
 Adi Granov, comic book artist

Literature
 Aleksandar Hemon, fiction writer
 Sasha Skenderija, poet
 Semir Osmanagić, writer
 Téa Obreht, novelist

Film
 Harun Mehmedinović, director, screenwriter and photographer
 Karl Malden, actor
 Ivana Miličević, actor
 Miraj Grbić, actor
 Sabina Vajrača, film director and film producer
 Sulejman Medenčević, cinematographer
 Tinka Milinović, television personality
 Sunny Suljic, actor and skateboarder
 Armin Habibovich, actor

Music
 Kemal Gekić, pianist
 Flory Jagoda guitarist, composer and singer
 Mladen Milicevic, composer and professor of music
 Vuk Kulenovic, composer

Politics
 Muhamed Sacirbey, businessman, lawyer, and former ambassador
 Anesa Kajtazovic, Iowa State Representative and first Bosnian-American elected official

Sports
 Esmir Bajraktarevic, soccer player
 J.R. Bremer, basketball player for the Bosnian national team
 Luka Garza, basketball player 
 Adnan Hodzic, basketball player
 Amer Delić, tennis player
 Baggio Husidić, soccer player for LA Galaxy
 Nedim Nišić, olympic swimmer
 Vedad Ibišević, soccer player
 Esad Komić, soccer player
 Refik Kozić, soccer player
 Peri Marošević, soccer player
 Emsad Zahirovic, soccer player
 Hajrudin Saračević, soccer player
 Damir Krupalija, basketball player
 Slobodan Janjuš, retired soccer player
 Mirsad Sejdić, retired soccer player
Goran Suton, basketball player
 Nina Bates, figure skater
 Mirsad Bektic, mixed martial artist
 Ajdin Penava, basketball player
 Amar Alibegović, basketball player

Other
 Sanela Diana Jenkins, entrepreneur and philanthropist who established the International Justice Clinic
 Mirsad Hadžikadić, UNC Charlotte professor and executive director of analytical programs. He has won local and state lifetime achievement awards in the field of information technology.

References

Bosnian Americans
 
Bosnian
American